is a Japanese composer, arranger, lyricist, pianist, and music producer best known for his work on many anime series, video games, television dramas, and movies. His works include the musical scores for Attack on Titan, The Seven Deadly Sins, Blue Exorcist, Guilty Crown, Kill la Kill, Seraph of the End, and Mobile Suit Gundam Unicorn. In addition to his role on the soundtrack, Sawano also composes many opening and ending theme songs. Overall, he has already provided the music for over 100 visual media works.

Sawano was nominated for the Newtype Anime Awards 11 times, winning 4 of the nominations. He has also won the Tokyo Anime Award three times, as well as two prizes at the 2022 Anime Trending Awards. In 2014, he started a vocal project under the name ''SawanoHiroyuki[nZk]''.

Biography

1980–2004: Early life
Sawano was born in Tokyo, Japan. He began playing piano in elementary school. By this time, he was influenced by the Japanese singer-songwriter Aska, from the duo Chage and Aska, whose songs led him to vaguely dream about working in music. In junior high school, he joined a band and began learning keyboard to take charge of it in the group.

From the age of 17, Sawano studied composition, arrangement, and orchestration under the music teacher Nobuchika Tsuboi. When he was in his final years of high school, he had a desire to work on soundtrack music, so he went to a vocational school focused in composition. In this same school, he made his first public music performance. Around this period, he used to listen to the soundtrack of Studio Ghibli's movies, which led him to be influenced by the film score composer Joe Hisaishi.

2004–present: Career
Sawano's musician career started in 2004, with him initially writing songs for other artists. He was in charge of his first soundtrack works in 2006.

In 2010, with Mobile Suit Gundam Unicorn, he had his first involvement in a major work, which he mentioned having worked on it with the hope that this series would trigger an offer for many further projects.

In 2011, with his involvement in two popular anime series—Blue Exorcist and Guilty Crown—, he became more notable in the industry. In both series, he also managed to build up a relationship with some vocalists, who would collaborate with him in future works.

It was in 2013, with his role as the composer for the anime adaptation of Hajime Isayama's manga series Attack on Titan, that pushed him into acknowledgement. In this year, for his work on the series, he won the Newtype Anime Awards in the Soundtrack category.

In 2014, he launched a vocal song project under the name "SawanoHiroyuki[nZk]", producing the first album UnChild with Aimer as the vocalist under the name SawanoHiroyuki[nZk]:Aimer. Since then his songs under this vocal song project have also been used as the opening and ending themes for various anime, including Aldnoah.Zero, Seraph of the End, Mobile Suit Gundam Unicorn RE:0096, The Legend of the Galactic Heroes: Die Neue These Kaikō, and Re:Creators. Sawano's vocal song project was moved to the Sacra Music record label under Sony Music Entertainment Japan in April 2017.

On July 2, 2017, Sawano's contract with Legendoor was terminated after approximately 12 years. He is now represented by VV-ALKLINE.

In 2020, Sawano started a soundtrack revival project called "Project【emU】", where he arranges a suite for the soundtrack of anime series he has been involved with. The suites are recorded and filmed in a studio, with guest musicians and vocalists, and uploaded on Sawano's YouTube channel, having already been released the ones for Attack on Titan, Guilty Crown, The Seven Deadly Sins, and Mobile Suit Gundam Unicorn. In February 2021, he made a "Project【emU】" concert event, "Sawano Hiroyuki LIVE【emU】2021", in which he performed many of the main tracks from the anime scores he was in charge.

On March 13, 2022, Sawano held the solo live "Hiroyuki Sawano LIVE [nZk]007", at Tokyo International Forum. The event featured the guest vocals Akihito Okano, Jean-Ken Johnny, ReoNa, mizuki, mpi, Benjamin, Laco, and SennaRin. Later, on April 23, the live was streamed to overseas audiences.

In April 2022, Sawano produced the debut extended play of the singer SennaRin. The EP, Dignified, was released on April 13, followed by an announcement that he will continue as a producer for her works.

On September 1, 2022, Sawano announced his new musical group NAQT VANE, in which he will act as total producer and will collaborate with singer Harukaze and Classic 6 as design director. The debut single, "Break Free", was released on September 16, 2022.

Musical style and influences 
Sawano cited Joe Hisaishi, Yoko Kanno, Hans Zimmer, and Danny Elfman as major inspirations.

His pieces tend to have exceedingly strange titles, featuring numbers, symbols, and letters from various different alphabets. He stated that he decided this so the people "is able to listen to the songs in their own way and have their own reaction. I don’t ever want to fix the image of what’s happening on-screen too much within the track title".

Most of Sawano's vocal songs feature lyrics in English, while he also makes use of German and Japanese lyrics. He often uses choruses and breaks in his pieces, aiming to expand the song and make it more intense.

When composing for series, Sawano stated that he usually writes the music before any video materials or animation is available.

Discography

As Hiroyuki Sawano

Original albums

Compilation albums

Singles

Other involvements

As SawanoHiroyuki[nZk]

Albums

Collaboration albums

Singles

Videography

Music videos

Works

Anime

Video games

Television dramas

Movies

Awards and nominations

References

External links 

  
 Hiroyuki Sawano profile at Oricon 
 Hiroyuki Sawano discography at VGMdb
 
 

 
1980 births
21st-century Japanese composers
Anime composers
Crunchyroll Anime Awards winners
Defstar Records artists
Japanese film score composers
Japanese lyricists
Japanese male composers
Japanese male film score composers
Japanese male musicians
Japanese music arrangers
Japanese television composers
Japanese record producers
Living people
Male television composers
Musicians from Tokyo
Video game composers